Davide Mucelli (born 19 November 1986) is an Italian former professional road bicycle racer, who rode professionally from 2012 to 2014, and 2016 to 2017 for the ,  and  teams.

Career
Born in Livorno, Mucelli competed as a professional from the start of 2012; he held the lead of the sprints classification on his UCI World Tour début, at the 2012 Tour of the Basque Country. For the 2014 season, Mucelli joined .

Major results

2006
 3rd GP Industria del Cuoio e delle Pelli
 3rd Memorial Fausto Coppi
2009
 1st GP Industria del Cuoio e delle Pelli
 3rd Firenze–Viareggio
 3rd Gran Premio Città di Felino
 6th Coppa della Pace
2010
 2nd Giro delle Valli Aretine
 4th Gran Premio San Giuseppe
2011
 3rd Gara Ciclistica Millionaria
 9th Piccolo Giro di Lombardia
 10th Ruota d'Oro
2012
 4th Coppa Ugo Agostoni
 10th Gran Premio Città di Camaiore
2013
 1st Giro dell'Appennino
 4th Giro del Medio Brenta
 7th Coppa Ugo Agostoni
 10th Trofeo Matteotti
 10th Coppa Sabatini
2014
 3rd Trofej Umag
 6th GP Izola
 8th Coppa Ugo Agostoni
 8th Gran Premio Industria e Commercio di Prato
 9th GP Industria & Artigianato di Larciano
 10th Poreč Trophy
 10th Grand Prix Südkärnten
2016
 7th GP Laguna
 9th Overall Tour of Bihor
 9th Memorial Marco Pantani
2017
 4th Poreč Trophy
 5th Gran Premio della Costa Etruschi
 10th Overall Tour of Qinghai Lake
 10th GP Izola

References

External links

Cycling Quotient profile

Italian male cyclists
1986 births
Living people
Sportspeople from Livorno
Cyclists from Tuscany
21st-century Italian people